"Superblood Wolfmoon" is a song by American rock band Pearl Jam. The song was released on February 18, 2020, as the second single from their eleventh studio album, Gigaton (2020).

Charts

References

External links

2020 singles
2020 songs
Pearl Jam songs
Songs written by Eddie Vedder
Monkeywrench Records singles